Four to the Bar was the first commercial release by the band of that name.  A four-cut EP, it was released on cassette in 1993.

Track listing 

St. Brendan's Voyage (Moore)
Raglan Road (Traditional/Kavanagh)
Mr. Maguire (Traditional)
Amadeus Killeen/Passing Time (O'Neill)

Personnel

David Yeates: Vocals, whistle, bodhrán
Martin Kelleher: Vocals, guitar, mandolin, bouzouki
Patrick Clifford: Bass, backing vocals
Keith O'Neill: Fiddle, tenor banjo

Production

All arrangements by Four to the Bar
Recorded in New York City, Winter 1993
Produced by Henry Gorman
Photograph by James Higgins

References
"Debut Recording from Four to the Bar," Irish Voice, Tuesday, March 2, 1993

External links
Four to the Bar official web site

Trivia

"Mr. Maguire" also appears on 1994's Craic on the Road.
A later version of "Passing Time" appears as "Passing My Time" on 1995's Another Son.
The "Killeen" in "Amadeus Killeen" is a tribute to a friend of composer Keith O'Neill.
Martin Kelleher's first instrument was the mandolin. These tracks are the only known recordings of him playing the instrument.
Producer Henry Gorman was a founding member of Big Stupid Guitars.
The cover shot was taken by James Higgins, a staff photographer for the Irish Voice newspaper.

1993 EPs
Four to the Bar albums